Johan of Schleswig-Holstein (9 July 1583 – 28 October 1602) was the youngest son of Frederick II of Denmark and Norway and Sophia of Mecklenburg-Schwerin. He went to Russia in 1602 as the bridegroom of Boris Godunov's daughter Ksenia (Xenia), but fell ill and died before the marriage could take place. It is possible that Boris Godunov's ministers may have poisoned him. The cancelled marriage between John and Ksenia was an attempt to ally Denmark-Norway with the Russian Empire.

Other notable facts

 In Alexander Pushkin's chamber drama Boris Godunov and the Mussorgsky opera based on it, Johan is referred to in Boris's monologue "I have attained the highest power":

I thought to make my daughter happy
By wedlock. Like a tempest Death took off
Her bridegroom—and at once a stealthy rumour
Pronounced me guilty of my daughter's grief--
Me, me, the hapless father!

Ancestry

References

Other sources
  "The Muscovite Embassy of 1599 to Emperor Rudolf II of Habsburg," by Isaiah Gruber (1999): page 86 (with footnote 3)

External links
 
 The Muscovite Embassy of 1599 to Emperor Rudolf II of Habsburg (pdf) by Isaiah Gruber

1583 births
1602 deaths
16th-century Danish people
17th-century Danish people
House of Oldenburg in Schleswig-Holstein
Danish princes
Burials at Roskilde Cathedral
Sons of kings